Myers Corner is a hamlet and census-designated place (CDP) in the town of Wappinger, Dutchess County, New York, United States. The population was 6,790 at the 2010 census. It is part of the Poughkeepsie–Newburgh–Middletown, NY Metropolitan Statistical Area as well as the larger New York–Newark–Bridgeport, NY-NJ-CT-PA Combined Statistical Area.

Myers Corner is in the town of Wappinger on County Route 93 and County Route 94. Myers Corners School is also located here.

Geography
Myers Corner is located in the eastern part of the town of Wappinger at  (41.592776, -73.872365). It is bordered on its farthest western extent by the village of Wappingers Falls and to the east by Sprout Creek, which forms the border with the town of East Fishkill.

Demographics

As of the census of 2000, there were 5,546 people, 1,808 households, and 1,583 families residing in the CDP. The population density was 1,301.3 per square mile (502.7/km2). There were 1,852 housing units at an average density of 434.5/sq mi (167.9/km2). The racial makeup of the CDP was 86.57% White, 4.31% African American, 0.22% Native American, 5.46% Asian, 0.05% Pacific Islander, 1.48% from other races, and 1.91% from two or more races. Hispanic or Latino of any race were 6.31% of the population.

There were 1,808 households, out of which 40.5% had children under the age of 18 living with them, 77.8% were married couples living together, 7.0% had a female householder with no husband present, and 12.4% were non-families. 9.8% of all households were made up of individuals, and 4.2% had someone living alone who was 65 years of age or older. The average household size was 3.06 and the average family size was 3.27.

In the CDP, the population was spread out, with 27.6% under the age of 18, 6.3% from 18 to 24, 27.4% from 25 to 44, 28.5% from 45 to 64, and 10.2% who were 65 years of age or older. The median age was 38 years. For every 100 females, there were 96.7 males. For every 100 females age 18 and over, there were 94.5 males.

The median income for a household in the CDP was $76,142, and the median income for a family was $81,894. Males had a median income of $61,856 versus $32,169 for females. The per capita income for the CDP was $27,114. About 1.7% of families and 3.3% of the population were below the poverty line, including 3.2% of those under age 18 and 4.4% of those age 65 or over.

References

Census-designated places in New York (state)
Hamlets in New York (state)
Poughkeepsie–Newburgh–Middletown metropolitan area
Census-designated places in Dutchess County, New York
Wappinger, New York
Hamlets in Dutchess County, New York